Aranitas is a village and a former municipality in Fier County, Albania. During the 2015 local government reform it became a subdivision of the municipality of Mallakastër. The population at the 2011 census was 2,714.
The name is derived from the Arianiti family, an Albanian noble family in the late Middle Ages.

Notable people
Xhemal Aranitasi, former commander in chief of the Royal Albanian Army, studied in the Monastir Military High School
Ali Shametaj, Albanian folk singer

References 

Former municipalities in Fier County
Administrative units of Mallakastër
Villages in Fier County